Jas. D. Easton, Inc. is a manufacturer of archery equipment.  The company was started by James D. (Doug) Easton in 1922. His son James (Jim) L. Easton took over the company following his death in 1972. The independent, family owned archery division consists of two companies, Hoyt Archery, Inc. and Easton Technical Products, both located in Salt Lake City, Utah, USA.  The two companies employ approximately 800 people in the manufacture of compound bows, recurve bows, and arrows.  Easton arrows have been used to win every Olympic Games title in archery since the restoration of archery to the Olympic program in 1972.  Easton Technical Products is also a supplier to the military, medical and outdoor sports industries for high-strength carbon fiber and aluminum alloy tubing.  Hoyt and Easton are run as independent divisions of Jas. D. Easton, Inc.  Greg Easton is the third generation President of Jas. D. Easton.

In other sports
Easton Sports merged with Fenway Partners-owned Riddell Bell in 2006 to form Easton-Bell, later known as BRG Sports.  Jim Easton was named chair of the company, which included the  Riddell, Bell, and Giro brands.  The archery business remained separate.  All other Easton brands were divested by BRG in 2014.
Easton Diamond (baseball and softball) is now owned by Rawlings.
Easton Hockey is now owned by Peak Achievement Athletics, parent of Bauer Hockey.
Easton Cycling is now owned by Fox Factory.

References

Archery
Family-owned companies of the United States
Manufacturing companies based in Utah